The 31st annual Venice International Film Festival was held from 19 August to 1 September 1970. There was no jury because from 1969 to 1979 the festival was not competitive.

Films premiered
 Wanda by Barbara Loden (USA)
 The Clowns by Federico Fellini (Italy)

Awards
Career Golden Lion:
Orson Welles
Pasinetti Award
Best Foreign Film - Wanda (Barbara Loden)
Best Italian Film - The Clowns (Federico Fellini)

References

External links
 
 Venice Film Festival 1970 Awards on IMDb

Venice International Film Festival
Venice International Film Festival
Venice Film Festival
Film
Venice International Film Festival
Venice International Film Festival